The South Bay Mill is a historic mill located in Hudson, Columbia County, New York, United States.

Description and history 

It "was built as a soap and candle factory in 1860 near the city's thriving Hudson River harbor trade and saw a number of industrial uses in the ensuing decades, lastly as a large-scale electronic goods manufactory...."

It was added to the National Register of Historic Places in 2022.

References

External links

National Register of Historic Places in Columbia County, New York
Hudson, New York